The 1996 Skoda Czech Open was a men's tennis tournament played on Clay in Prague, Czech Republic that was part of the International Series of the 1996 ATP Tour.
Libor Pimek and Byron Talbot were the defending champions but lost in the semifinals to Yevgeny Kafelnikov and Daniel Vacek.

Kafelnikov and Vacek won in the final 6–3, 6–7, 6–3 against Luis Lobo and Javier Sánchez.

Seeds
Champion seeds are indicated in bold text while text in italics indicates the round in which those seeds were eliminated.

 Yevgeny Kafelnikov /  Daniel Vacek (champions)
 Luis Lobo /  Javier Sánchez (final)
 David Rikl /  Emilio Sánchez (quarterfinals)
 Martin Damm /  Cyril Suk (semifinals)

Draw

External links
 1996 Skoda Czech Open Doubles draw

Prague Open (1987–1999)
1996 ATP Tour